Edwin "Ed" Richards (November 3, 1929 – November 18, 2012) was an American fencer. Richards won the US foil championship in 1962 and 1963, and represented Team USA at the 1959, 1963, and 1967 Pan American Games where he won two gold medals and a silver medal in team competition. 

He competed in the individual and team foil events at the 1964 Summer Olympics. He was a 2005 USA Fencing Hall of Fame inductee.

References

External links
 

1929 births
2012 deaths
American male foil fencers
Olympic fencers of the United States
Fencers at the 1964 Summer Olympics
Pan American Games medalists in fencing
Pan American Games gold medalists for the United States
Pan American Games silver medalists for the United States
MIT Engineers fencing coaches
Fencers at the 1959 Pan American Games
Fencers at the 1963 Pan American Games
Fencers at the 1967 Pan American Games